Congregation Emanu-El of New York is the first Reform Jewish congregation in New York City. It has served as a flagship congregation in the Reform branch of Judaism since its founding in 1845. The congregation uses Temple Emanu-El of New York, one of the largest synagogues in the world.

The congregation currently comprises approximately 2,000 families and has been led by Senior Rabbi Joshua M. Davidson since July 2013. The congregation is located at 1 East 65th Street on the Upper East Side of Manhattan. The Temple houses the Bernard Museum of Judaica, the congregation's Judaica collection of over 1,000 objects.

History

1845–1926

The congregation was founded by 33 mainly German Jews who assembled for services in April 1845 in a rented hall near Grand and Clinton Streets in Manhattan's Lower East Side. The first services they held were highly traditional. The Temple (as it became known) moved several times as the congregation grew larger and wealthier.

In October 1847, the congregation relocated to a former Methodist church at 56 Chrystie Street. The congregation commissioned architect Leopold Eidlitz to draw up plans for renovation of the church into a synagogue. Radical departures from Orthodox religious practice were soon introduced to Temple Emanu-El, setting precedents which proclaimed the principles of 'classical' Reform Judaism in America. In 1848, the German vernacular spoken by the congregants replaced the traditional liturgical language of Hebrew in prayer books. Instrumental music, formerly banished from synagogues, was first played during services in 1849, when an organ was installed. In 1853, the tradition of calling congregants for aliyot was abolished (but retained for bar mitzvah ceremonies), leaving the reading of the Torah exclusively to the presiding rabbi. By 1869 the Chrystie Street building became the home of Congregation Beth Israel Bikur Cholim.

Further changes were made in 1854 when Temple Emanu-El moved to 12th Street. Most controversially, mixed seating was adopted, allowing families to sit together, instead of segregating the sexes on opposite sides of a mechitza. After much heated debate, the congregation also resolved to observe Rosh Hashanah for only one day rather than the customary two.

In 1857 after the death of Founding Rabbi Merzbacher, German speakers still formed a majority of the congregation and appointed another German Jew, Samuel Adler, to be his successor.

In 1868, Emanu-El erected a new building for the first time, a Moorish Revival structure by Leopold Eidlitz, assisted by Henry Fernbach at 43rd Street and 5th Avenue after raising about $650,000.

The congregation hired its first English speaking rabbi, Gustav Gottheil, in 1873, from Manchester, England.

In 1888, Joseph Silverman became the first American-born rabbi to officiate at the Temple. He was a member of the second class to graduate from Hebrew Union College.

The 1870s and 1880s witnessed further departures from traditional ritual. Men could now pray without wearing kippot to cover their heads. Bar mitzvah ceremonies were no longer held. The Union Prayer Book was adopted in 1895.

Felix Adler, the founder of the Ethical Culture movement, came to New York as a child when his father, Samuel L. Adler, took over as the rabbi of Temple Emanu-El, an appointment that placed him among the most influential figures in Reform Judaism.

In 1924, Lazare Saminsky became music director of the Temple, and made it a center of Jewish music. He also composed and commissioned music for the Temple services.

1926–present
In January 1926, the existing synagogue (built in 1868), was sold to the developer Benjamin Winter Sr. for $6,500,000 who then sold it to Joseph Durst in December 1926 for $7,000,000. In 1927, Durst demolished the building to make room for commercial development.

Emanu-El merged with Temple Beth-El in New York, New York on April 11, 1927, and both are considered co-equal parents of the current Emanu-El. The new synagogue was built in 1928-1930.

By the 1930s, Emanu-El began to absorb large numbers of Jews whose families had arrived in poverty from Eastern Europe and brought with them their Yiddish language and devoutly Orthodox religious heritage. In contrast, Emanu-El was dominated by affluent German-speaking Jews whose liberal approaches to Judaism originated in Western Europe, where civic emancipation had enticed Jews to discard many of their ethnoreligious customs and embrace the lifestyles of their neighbors. For the descendants of Eastern European immigrants, joining Temple Emanu-El often signified their upward mobility and progress in assimilating into American society. However, the intake of these new congregants also helped to slow or halt, if not force a limited retreat from, the 'rejectionist' attitude which 'classical' Reform had espoused towards traditional ritual.

From 1934 to 1947, Dr. Samuel H. Goldenson (1878–1962) was the senior rabbi of Temple Emanu-El. He was president of the Central Conference of American Rabbis from 1933 to 1935.

In 1973, David M. Posner joined the rabbinical staff. Known for his active involvement in the community, he served as the congregation's Senior Emeritus rabbi after his retirement.

Synagogues of Congregation Emanu-El

Synagogue built in 1847

Synagogue built in 1854

Synagogue built in 1868

Synagogue built in 1891

Synagogue built in 1930

Notable members and funerals

 Benjamin Altheimer
 Charles Benenson
 Robert A. Bernhard
 Dorothy Lehman Bernhard 
 Milton H. Biow
 Leon Black
 Harvey R. Blau
 Paul Block
 Michael Bloomberg
 Lyman Bloomingdale
 Samuel Bloomingdale
 Nathan Burkan
 Benjamin Buttenwieser
 Barbaralee Diamonstein-Spielvogel
 Simon M. Ehrlich
 Lee K. Frankel
 Charles Frohman
 Bernard Gimbel
 Alan "Ace" Greenberg
 Joseph B. Greenhut
 David M. Heyman
 Martin Kimmel
 Ed Koch
 Alfred J. Koeppel
 Andrew Lack
 Abraham E. Lefcourt
 Adele Lewisohn Lehman
 Herbert H. Lehman
 Irving Lehman
 Samuel D. Levy
 Walter Lippmann
 Solomon Loeb
 Louis Marshall
 Bernard H. Mendik
 William A. Moses
 Adolph Ochs
 Milton Petrie
 Victor Potamkin
 Joan Rivers
 Chester H. Roth
 Simon F. Rothschild
 Frank Russek
 Mel Sachs
 David Sarnoff
 Jacob Schiff
 M. Lincoln Schuster
 Sime Silverman
 Carl Spielvogel
 Eliot Spitzer
 Alfred Steckler
 Oscar S. Straus
 Lewis L. Strauss
 Sarah Lavanburg Straus
 Kay Thompson
 Harold Uris
 Felix M. Warburg
 Frieda Schiff Warburg
 Paul F. Warburg
 Jeff Zucker

References

External links

 

1845 establishments in New York (state)
1929 establishments in New York (state)
Classical Reform Judaism
German-Jewish culture in New York City
Leopold Eidlitz buildings
Reform synagogues in New York City
Religious organizations established in 1845
Romanesque Revival architecture in New York City
Romanesque Revival synagogues
Synagogues completed in 1929
Synagogues in Manhattan
Upper East Side